Count Nikolaus Zmeskall von Domanovecz (20 November 1759, Leštiny, Kingdom of Hungary (present day Slovakia) – 23 June 1833, Vienna, Austria) was an official in the Hungarian Court Chancellery, living in Vienna. He was a musician and friend of Ludwig van Beethoven.

Friend of Beethoven

Zmeskall was a civil servant at the Hungarian Court Chancellery in Vienna. He played the cello, and there were regular sessions on Sundays of chamber music at his house in the Bürgerspital part of the city.

Beethoven first met him in the 1790s, probably in the house of the composer's patron Karl Alois, Prince Lichnowsky. He was one of Beethoven's earliest friends in Vienna, and remained so for the rest of the composer's life. From 1806, when Beethoven broke relations with Prince Lichnowsky, most of his chamber music was first played in Zmeskall's house.

There are more than 100 letters and notes from Beethoven to Zmeskall, the last written a month before the composer's death. They often met in the tavern Zum Schwan near Bürgerspital; Zmeskall gave minor help to Beethoven, such as providing him with pens, a watch, and loaning books.

A work by Beethoven written in 1796 or 1797, for viola and cello, WoO 32, entitled "Duet mit zwei obligaten Augengläsern" ("Duet with two obbligato eyeglasses"), was dedicated to Zmeskall; it was written for Beethoven and Zmeskall, who both wore spectacles, to play together. Beethoven also dedicated his String Quartet No. 11 in F minor (published in 1816) to Zmeskall.

During the winter of 1819–1820 Zmeskall was ill, and afterwards suffered from rheumatism, which hampered his musical activities and limited his association with Beethoven. However, he was present at the first performance of Beethoven's Ninth Symphony on 7 May 1824.

Zmeskall died in Vienna in 1833.

Compositions
Zmeskall's compositions include string quartets, a piano rondo. and several cello sonatas.

References

1759 births
1833 deaths
18th-century Hungarian people
19th-century Hungarian people
Hungarian male classical composers